Both the Montana incumbents were re-elected.

See also 
 List of United States representatives from Montana
 United States House of Representatives elections, 1972

1972
Montana
1972 Montana elections